Ernabel Castro Demillo  is an Emmy-award winning American television journalist. She is the host and producer of CUNY TV's  monthly magazine show, "Asian American Life", which debuted on June 10, 2013.  The premiere show was nominated for a NY News Emmy for Best Community Affairs/Public Programming in 2014.  The show has been nominated for 10 Emmys since its debut.  Her short documentary featured on Asian American Life in 2019, “Fighting Hunger, Feeding Minds: A New Yorker’s Mission to Keep Kids in School in Rural Philippines” won a 2021 Emmy.  Demillo was also notably nominated for a New York Emmy for Best Historical/Cultural Segment for Asian American Life in 2017 for her feature "The Ties that Bind: Filipinos in New York". In 2017, she was the inaugural recipient of the Frank LoMonte Ethics in Journalism Award, which is given someone who performs "in an outstanding ethical manner demonstrating the ideals of CMA’s Code of Ethical Behavior." Demillo was honored for fighting against her employer Saint Peter's University when they attempted to censor
the Pauw Wow the student-run newspaper she advised.

Early life
Demillo was born Ernabel Castro Demillo in 1965, and her parents are father Harriman E. Demillo and mother Flordeliza (both of the Philippines). She has a younger brother Emil Castro Demillo. and sister, Emiliza.

Education 
She received her M.S. in Journalism from Northwestern University's Medill School of Journalism and her B.A. in journalism and international relations from the University of Southern California.

Career 
Since 2011 she has also worked for CUNY-TV's Emmy-nominated science magazine show, "Science and U".  Her segment on Bash the Trash, an eco-friendly musical group, was nominated for a New York Emmy in 2013 for Best Environment Program.  Demillo has also worked as a news reader for Court-TV and reporter for MSNBC.

From 1996-2005 she was a reporter and fill-anchor for FOX-5 New York's morning show, Good Day New York. Prior to her move to New York, Demillo was a reporter for the CBS affiliate, KOVR-13 News in Sacramento, California, and a reporter for the now shuttered Orange County News Channel in Orange County, California.

Demillo is also chair of the Department of Communication and Media Culture at Saint Peter's University in Jersey City, New Jersey.  She started the journalism minor in 2008 and currently teaches courses in journalism and communication.

Personal life
She is in a relationship and has a child with former ABC Newscaster and now WPIX news anchor John Muller, and resides in Tinton Falls, New Jersey with their daughter, Alexa, born May 7, 2003.

See also
 Filipinos in the New York metropolitan area
 New Yorkers in journalism

References

1965 births
American television journalists
Living people
Medill School of Journalism alumni
People from Tinton Falls, New Jersey
Saint Peter's University faculty